DeGraffenreidt-Johnson House is a historic home located near Silk Hope, Chatham County, North Carolina.  It was built about 1850, and is a two-story, three bay vernacular Greek Revival style frame dwelling.  It features a low hipped roof and one-story porch. The house is almost identical to the nearby William P. Hadley House.

It was listed on the National Register of Historic Places in 1985.

In 2017, DeGraffenredt-Johnson House was moved to Maine to avoid the damage caused by Hurricane Irma.

References

Houses on the National Register of Historic Places in North Carolina
Greek Revival houses in North Carolina
Houses completed in 1850
Houses in Chatham County, North Carolina
National Register of Historic Places in Chatham County, North Carolina